Hold That Plane! is the third studio album by blues guitarist Buddy Guy. It was recorded in November 1969, but not released by Vanguard Records until 1972.

History 
Buddy Guy had no luck with the record companies. Although he had recorded for Chess since 1958 (mostly as a sideman), his first full-length album wasn't released until ten years later (consisting of material recorded between 1965 and 1967). After leaving Chess, Buddy signed with Vanguard Records who released his second LP in 1968. Though this was a good period for Buddy (he was under new management who organized a lot of live work- especially for big music festivals), and he was popular with black and white audiences as a result, his recording career was still full of unfulfilled promise. A new band (including his brother Phil Guy on rhythm guitar) recorded these tracks in November 1969, but they inexplicably weren't released until almost three years later in 1972. Including two Guy originals (one written with his brother Phil), fiery covers of the Muddy Waters classic "I'm Ready" and the Willie Cobbs hit "You Don't Love Me" (regularly covered by The Allman Brothers Band at this time). The album opens with a funky adaptation of Herbie Hancock's modern jazz classic "Watermelon Man".

Track listing

Personnel 
 Buddy Guy – guitar, vocals
 Phil Guy – guitar
 A.C. Reed – tenor saxophone
 Gary Bartz – alto saxophone
 Junior Mance – piano
 Earnest Johnson – bass
 Jesse Lewis – drums
Additional musicians
 Bill Folwell – bass on "Watermelon Man"
 Barry Altschul – drums on "Watermelon Man"
 Mark Jordan – piano on "Come See About Me"
 Freebo – bass on "Come See About Me"
 David "Rip" Stock – drums on "Come See About Me"
Technical
Jules Halfant - album design
Joel Brodsky - cover photography

References 

Buddy Guy albums
Vanguard Records albums
Albums produced by Michael Cuscuna
1972 albums
Albums with cover art by Joel Brodsky